The Green Ribbon is a 1929 crime novel by the British writer Edgar Wallace. Like a number of Wallace's novels it is set against the backdrop of the horseracing world.

Film adaptation
In 1961 it was turned into the film Never Back Losers, directed by Robert Tronson as part of a long-running series of Wallace films made at Merton Park Studios.

References

Bibliography
 Goble, Alan. The Complete Index to Literary Sources in Film. Walter de Gruyter, 1999.

1929 British novels
Novels by Edgar Wallace
British crime novels
British novels adapted into films
Hutchinson (publisher) books